Mark K. Koncar (born May 5, 1953) is a former American football offensive tackle. He is a graduate from Murray High School located in Murray, Utah. After graduating high school Koncar attended the University of Colorado Boulder. Koncar was drafted by the Green Bay Packers in the 1976 NFL Draft, playing for five seasons before playing for the Houston Oilers. After playing for the Oilers he retired.

References 
databaseFootball.com
The 1976 NFL Draft

1953 births
Living people
American football offensive tackles
Colorado Buffaloes football players
Green Bay Packers players
Houston Oilers players
People from Murray, Utah